A cover model is a male or female whose photograph appears on the front cover of a magazine. The cover model is generally a fashion model, celebrity, or contest winner. Generally, cover models are depicted solitarily; however, on occasion magazines will present a front cover with multiple cover models. Female cover models are often referred to as cover girls.

Cover models generally take part in a fashion or portrait photography photo shoot for the magazine. When a magazine depicts a candid or stock image for the main cover image, the talent is referred to as the magazine "cover" rather than "cover model" or "cover girl".

See also
 List of Allure cover models
 List of Marie Claire cover models
 List of Sports Illustrated Swimsuit Issue cover models
 List of Vogue cover models

References

Modeling (profession)